McAllen or MacAllen is a Scottish and Irish surname, originating from Scottish Gaelic. Historically, the name has migrated to Ireland, where the prefix of the name has been commonly transposed with "Mc". The first recorded arrivals to Ireland bearing this name came in the 15th century to County Donegal, with the arrival of Gallowglas military families to support the Irish nobility of the north.

The surname McAllen has hereditary connections with the popular surname Allen. The noble family of this surname, from which a branch went to Portugal, is descended from one Alanus de Buckenhall.

People
Charles McAllen (1860 – 1924), Australian cricketer
Kathleen Rowe McAllen (1960–), American actress

Other
McAllen, Texas, named after Scottish-American businessman John B McAllen

Scottish surnames
Patronymic surnames